This is a list of the treaties and agreements signed during the history of the Eastern Roman or Byzantine Empire.  The definition of a treaty is any agreement between the Byzantine Empire and any foreign power, including peace agreements, trade agreements, and understandings between the two powers.  For external conflicts see Byzantine wars.

Constantinian dynasty (306–363)

Valentinian–Theodosian dynasty (364–457)
Peace of Acilisene (387) – Peace treaty between Sassanid Empire and Eastern Roman Empire, dividing Greater Armenia in half.

Leonid dynasty (457–518)

Justinian dynasty (518–602)
 Eternal Peace (532), between the Byzantines and Sassanid Persia
 Fifty-Year Peace Treaty (562) – between Byzantines and Sassanid Persia

Non-dynastic (602–610)

Heraclian dynasty (610–711)

Non-dynastic (711–717)
Byzantine–Bulgarian Treaty of 716 – Officially ends the Battle of Anchialus and establishes the borders between Byzantium and the Bulgarian Empire.

Isaurian dynasty (717–802)

Nikephoros' dynasty (802–813)
Pax Nicephori (803) peace treaty between Charlemagne and Nicephorus I

Non-dynastic (813–820)
Byzantine–Bulgarian Treaty of 815 with the Bulgarian Empire.

Phrygian dynasty (820–867)

Macedonian dynasty (867–1056)
Rus'–Byzantine Treaty (907)
Rus'–Byzantine Treaty (911)
Rus'–Byzantine Treaty (945)
Treaty of Safar (970)
 Byzantine–Georgian treaty of 1022
 Byzantine–Georgian treaty of 1031

Non-dynastic (1056–1057)

Komnenid dynasty (1057–1059)

Doukid dynasty (1059–1081)

Komnenid dynasty (1081–1185)
Byzantine–Venetian Treaty of 1082
Treaty of Devol (1108) with Bohemond I of Antioch

Angelid dynasty (1185–1204)

Laskarid dynasty (Empire of Nicaea, 1204–1261)
Treaty of Nymphaeum (1214)
Nicaean–Venetian Treaty of 1219
Nicaean–Latin Armistice of 1260
Treaty of Nymphaeum (1261)

Palaiologan dynasty (1261–1453)

Byzantine–Venetian treaty of 1268
Byzantine–Venetian treaty of 1277
Byzantine–Trapezuntine treaty of 1282
Byzantine–Venetian treaty of 1285
Byzantine–Venetian treaty of 1302
Byzantine–Venetian treaty of 1310
Byzantine–Venetian treaty of 1324
Treaty of Chernomen (1327)
Byzantine–Venetian treaty of 1332
Byzantine–Aydinid alliance (1335)
Byzantine–Venetian treaty of 1342
Byzantine–Venetian treaty of 1357
Byzantine–Venetian treaty of 1363
Byzantine–Venetian treaty of 1370
Byzantine–Venetian treaty of 1376
Byzantine–Venetian treaty of 1390
Treaty of Gallipoli (1403) – agreement that released the Byzantine Empire of vassalage to the Ottoman Empire and extensive territorial additions.
Byzantine–Venetian treaty of 1406
Byzantine–Venetian treaty of 1412
Byzantine–Venetian treaty of 1418
Byzantine–Venetian treaty of 1423
Byzantine–Venetian treaty of 1431
Byzantine–Venetian treaty of 1436
Byzantine–Venetian treaty of 1442
Byzantine–Venetian treaty of 1448

References

Sources